Morning Star College, established in 1971, is a private general degree college and seminary in Barrackpore. It offers undergraduate courses in arts.  It is affiliated to West Bengal State University.

Departments

Arts
English 
History
Environmental Studies
Philosophy

See also
Education in India
List of colleges in West Bengal
Education in West Bengal

References

External links
Morning Star College

Catholic universities and colleges in India
Universities and colleges in North 24 Parganas district
Colleges affiliated to West Bengal State University
Educational institutions established in 1971
1971 establishments in West Bengal